The  is a traditional Japanese hip- or thigh-length jacket worn over a kimono. Resembling a shortened kimono with no overlapping front panels, the  typically features a thinner collar than that of a kimono, and is sewn with the addition of two thin, triangular panels at either side seam.

During the Edo period, economic growth within the wealthy but low-status merchant classes resulted in an excess of disposable income, much of which was spent on clothing. It was during this period that, due to various edicts on dress mandated by the ruling classes, merchant-class Japanese men began to wear  with plain external designs and lavishly-decorated linings, a trend still seen in men's  today.

In modern-day Japan,  are worn by both men and women.

See also
 , an informal and often padded Japanese jacket
 , a lightweight jacket traditionally worn by shopkeepers or employees as uniform, and commonly worn to festivals in Japan
 , a sleeveless padded outer vest worn by young children over their kimono to outings and on occasions such as 
 , a double-breasted Japanese overcoat characterised by a square neckline and dual fastenings

References

External links 

  at the University of Michigan Museum of Art
  at the British Museum
 'Behind the Scenes in Conservation: Japanese ' from the Cincinnati Art Museum

Japanese upper-body garments
Japanese words and phrases
Jackets